Hubert Schwab (born 5 April 1982 in Bottmingen) is a Swiss former professional road bicycle racer. In his final year as a professional he rode for UCI Continental team Price–Custom Bikes. He retired from cycling after 2011 in order to return to his studies.

In Stage 6 of the 2007 Giro d'Italia Schwab was in a breakaway finishing 4th on the stage moving him into the lead of the youth classification. This allowed him to wear the White Jersey for two days.

Major results
Sources:

2004
 1st  Road race, National Under-23 Road Championships
 6th Berner Rundfahrt
 7th Annemasse–Bellegarde et retou
 9th Tour du Lac Leman
 10th Road race, European Under-23 Road Championships
 10th Tour du Jura
2005 
 1st Stage 1 Vuelta Ciclista a Navarra
 6th Giro del Lago Maggiore
 8th Tour du lac Léman
 10th Overall Flèche du Sud
 10th Clásica Memorial Txuma
2007
 8th Overall Tour de l'Ain
2010
 National Road Championships
4th Road race
8th Time trial
 2nd Overall Tour Alsace
 5th GP Kranj
 6th Overall Szlakiem Grodów Piastowskich
 9th GP du Canton d'Argovie

Grand Tour general classification results timeline

References

External links 

Official website

Swiss male cyclists
1982 births
Living people
Sportspeople from Basel-Landschaft